Nicholas, Count of Salm (Vielsalm, Belgium  1459 – Salmhof, Marchegg, Lower Austria, 4 May 1530) was a German soldier and an Imperial senior military commander (German: Feldherr).  His greatest achievement was the defense of Vienna during the first siege by the Turks in 1529.

Life 
At the age of 17 in 1476, Nicholas participated in the Battle of Morat against Charles the Bold.  In 1488 he fought in Flanders and was made an Imperial Colonel three years later.  In 1509 he fought in Italy under Georg von Frundsberg and conquered Istria. 

In 1502, he married Elisabeth von Rogendorff; they had several children, including:
 Nicholas II, count of Salm-Neuburg
 Wolfgang of Salm, Bishop of Passau

In the Battle of Pavia in 1525 Nicholas of Salm played an important role in taking King Francis I of France prisoner. The following year he crushed the Peasants' Revolt in Tirol and conquered Schladming.

In 1529 aged 70, he was asked to organize the defense of Vienna during the first siege by the Turks, which he did with great skill and success.  During the siege, he was wounded by a falling rock, and died a few months later from his wounds.

Honours 

He was made a Knight in the Order of the Golden Fleece.

His tomb sculpture, made by Loy Hering, can still be seen in the Votive Church in Vienna.

In popular culture

Salm is the central figure in the modern era German author Wolfgang Hohlbein's novel Die Wiederkehr.

Salm figures in The Shadow of the Vulture, by Robert E. Howard, where he is acquainted with, and still has respect for, fallen knight von Kalmbach.

As "Von Salm", he figures as a supporting character in the Tim Powers novel The Drawing of the Dark.

External links 
 ADB, Niclas I Graf zu Salm
 

1459 births
1530 deaths
Nicholas
Knights of the Golden Fleece
Military personnel of the Holy Roman Empire